Castle of Magic is a platform game developed and published by Gameloft. It was released in 2008. It appeared on platforms including Java, iOS, Nintendo DSi.

Plot 
The action takes place on the beach. The heroes of this game — a boy and a girl, bored from broken video game, decide to find a new occupation. And they found the chest. But they didn't expect the chest itself will open: it was magical. After that, our heroes find themselves in a magical world. There's an evil wizard kidnaps his girlfriend, and the boy becomes a magician. The wizard offers him go through all the worlds, then in the end to defeat him. When he disappeared with the girl, the boy followed behind him. At last he had defeated the evil wizard Nefatex, but the game teased a new, greater threat for a subsequent adventure.

Development 
Castle of Magic began as a mobile game, created in September 2008. In 2009 an realmec2 version was launched. All environments were reproduced using 3D graphics and control was based on on-screen touch controls. In November 2009, the company launched an adaptation of the game for the Nintendo DSi system, which is specially developed for a platform game.

Reviews 
↓ Castle of Magic Review — IGN:

http://www.ign.com/articles/2009/11/26/castle-of-magic-review

↓ E3: A Look at Gameloft's 'Castle of Magic' Side Scrolling Platformer | Touch Arcade:

http://toucharcade.com/2009/06/02/a-look-at-gamelofts-castle-of-magic-side-scrolling-platformer/

↓ Castle of Magic Review | Slide To Play:

http://www.slidetoplay.com/review/castle-of-magic-review/

References

External links
 Official developer's site
 Castle Of Magic on Twitter

Platform games
Gameloft games
IOS games
DSiWare games
J2ME games